Werkman is a surname. Notable people with the surname include:

Chester Hamlin Werkman (1893–1962), American microbiologist
 (born 1939), Dutch writer and literary critic
Hendrik Nicolaas Werkman (1882–1945), Dutch artist, typographer, and printer
H.N. Werkman College
Nick Werkman, American basketball player

See also
Berkman
Workman (surname)